John Macphail (14 October 1923 – 10 June 2004) was a Scotland international rugby union player. The John Macphail Scholarship for Scottish rugby union players is named in the memory of the player.

Rugby Union career

Amateur career

Macphail was born in the Amber Mansions of Singapore; but brought up in first in South Africa and then in Scotland. He attended Edinburgh Academy, and played rugby union for Edinburgh Academicals.

Provincial career

He was capped for Edinburgh District. He played in the 1949 inter-city match against Glasgow District.

International career

He was capped for Scotland twice, playing first against England at Twickenham in 1949, and then against South Africa at Murrayfield in 1951.

Business career

He became the Chairman of the Scottish Whisky Association; and of the Edrington Group in Glasgow. He was awarded the CBE medal.

Family

His father Lachlan Rose Macphail was a Scottish stockbroker. He died in 1937, when John Macphail was just 13.

Macphail married Edith Crabbie in Edinburgh in 1947.

They had 2 children: Copper and Michael.

Death

He was buried in Logierait Churchyard.

Scholarship

The John Macphail Scholarship is a rugby union scholarship for up and coming Scottish players, and is made by the Robertson Trust in memory of John Macphail. The scholarship began for season 2005-06 and is awarded annually.

References

1923 births
2004 deaths
Scottish rugby union players
Scotland international rugby union players
Edinburgh Academicals rugby union players
Edinburgh District (rugby union) players
Sportspeople from Singapore
Rugby union hookers